Dealt is a 2017 American documentary film directed by Luke Korem. The film is about the life and career of Richard Turner - who is renowned as one of the world's greatest card magicians, yet he is completely blind.

In the documentary, Richard traces his journey from his troubled childhood, when he began losing his vision, to present day as he relentlessly pursues perfection while struggling with the reality that his biggest weakness might also be his greatest strength. The film features extensive vérité footage of both Richard and his family as well as archive footage of Turner's many television appearances. The film features interviews with notable magicians including Turner, Johnny Thompson, Max Maven, Armando Lucero, and Jason England.

Dealt debuted at the 2017 South By Southwest Film Festival in competition where it won the Audience Award for Best Documentary Feature. Dealt went on to win four more audience awards and screened at festivals around the world including China and New Zealand. The film is distributed by IFC Films through Sundance Selects. In the US, the film can be viewed on Hulu, Amazon and iTunes. Internationally, it is available on Netflix.

Critical response 
Dealt received overwhelming positive reviews including a Critics Pick by the Los Angeles Times. Rotten Tomatoes reports a high score of 95%. LA Weekly and The Village Voice said the film is an "Illuminating, beautifully composed portrait". The New York Times said the subject is "Captivating. A dynamic personality", and Variety calls the film a "fascinating portrait of a blind card mechanic". Teller, of the famed magic duo Penn & Teller, said "Dealt knocked me dead. Turner and the tough love of his family won my heart. A great documentary." After its theatrical release, Dealt rose to #1 on the iTunes doc charts and was selected as their Editors' Choice.

References

External links 
 
 

2017 films
2017 documentary films
American documentary films
American independent films
Documentary films about blind people
Documentary films about entertainers
Films about magic and magicians
2010s English-language films
2010s American films